Guerrière was a sail and steam  of the French Navy. She is known as the flagship of Admiral Pierre-Gustave Roze during the French campaign against Korea in 1866.

Career 
Built as a 56-gun sail frigate on a design by Boucher and Masson, Guerrière was transformed by jumboisation of the steam engine section in October 1866. As such, under Captain Olivier, she became Pierre-Gustave Roze's flagship during the French campaign against Korea in 1866. On 30 August 1867, Guerrière was severely damaged in a typhoon in the South China Sea whilst on a voyage from Japan to Hong Kong, China.

In 1869, she was transformed into a troopship by addition of a second covered deck. In 1871, she was used to ferry German war prisoners after the Franco-Prussian War. The next year, under Commander Charles Boucarut, she transported prisoners of the Paris Commune sentenced to deportation to New Caledonia.

In the following years, she shuttled between France and Algeria before being hulked in 1889 and broken up around 1913.

A model of Guerrière is on display at the Musée national de la Marine, inside a dry dock.

Notes, citations, and references

Citations

References

Ships built in France
1860 ships
Maritime incidents in August 1867